John Francis "Jay" Ward (September 9, 1938 – February 24, 2012) was a Major League Baseball player and coach. He was also a manager in the minor leagues.

Early life
Jay Ward was born on September 9, 1938 in Brookfield, Missouri to John and Francis Ward. He graduated from Highland High School in Highland, Illinois in 1956.

Playing career
In his first professional season with the Kearney Yankees of the Nebraska State League, Ward batted .331 with seven home runs and earned All-League honors. Two of those seven home runs were grand slams hit in consecutive innings on August 17.

He was plucked from the Yankees' farm system in the  minor league draft by the Kansas City Athletics. It was as a member of their organization that Ward put together his finest minor league season.

At the  winter meetings, he was dealt to the Los Angeles Dodgers with Stan Johnson and Bobby Prescott for Bill Lajoie and Gordie Windhorn. Though Johnson and Prescott both had major league experience, only Ward and Windhorn would ever make a major league appearance after this deal. Midway through his first season in the Dodgers organization, he was dealt to the Minnesota Twins for Bert Cueto.

A spring training injury to starting third baseman Rich Rollins opened the door for Ward to join the Twins early in the  season. His first major league hit was a two-run double off Orlando Pena to lead the Twins to a 2-0 victory over Kansas City. It would be his only hit of the season, and he would be returned to the Dallas-Fort Worth Rangers in mid-June.

He would return to the Twins as a September call-up the following season, and batted .226 in 12 games.

It would be six more years before Ward would return to the majors. In five plate appearances, he drew two walks, but did not get a hit.

Coaching
After one more season in the Kansas City Royals organization, Ward pulled the plug on his playing career and returned to the Minnesota Twins organization as manager of their Midwest League affiliate, the Wisconsin Rapids Twins. He managed the team to a 70-56 record, but decided to leave baseball for a while, and moved back to his home state, Missouri.

A year later, he managed the Vermont Reds to the Eastern League championship. Following the season, Lou Piniella brought him back to the majors and the organization he started with, naming him hitting coach for the New York Yankees. The  Yankees batted .262, down from .271 the previous season, and after just one season with the Yankees, he was replaced by Chris Chambliss.

Later life
He retired to Troy, Montana with his wife Lynn where he enjoyed hunting and fishing. He died at age 73 on February 24, 2012. Survivors included his wife Lynn; three daughters, 2 step daughters and one son and their spouses; 17 grandchildren; and one great-grandchild. He was preceded in death by one grandchild.

References

External links

Williamsport Bills managers
1938 births
2012 deaths
Major League Baseball second basemen
Minnesota Twins players
Cincinnati Reds players
Chunichi Dragons players
Kearney Yankees players
Greenville Majors players
Missoula Timberjacks players
Fargo-Moorhead Twins players
Shreveport Sports players
Dallas Rangers players
Hawaii Islanders players
Spokane Indians players
Vancouver Mounties players
Tacoma Giants players
Atlanta Crackers players
Denver Bears players
Portland Beavers players
Indianapolis Indians players
Omaha Royals players
American expatriate baseball players in Japan
Baseball players from Missouri
New York Yankees coaches
Montreal Expos coaches
Major League Baseball hitting coaches
People from Brookfield, Missouri